Brian Mark Cogan (born April 22, 1954) is a senior United States district judge of the United States District Court for the Eastern District of New York who joined that court in 2006.

Education and career 

Cogan was born in 1954 in Chicago, Illinois. He graduated from University of Illinois with a Bachelor of Arts in 1975 and received his Juris Doctor from Cornell Law School in 1979, where he was an editor of the Cornell Law Review. Following graduation, Cogan clerked for Judge Sidney Aronovitz of the United States District Court for the Southern District of Florida. Prior to his appointment to the federal bench, Cogan was a partner of Stroock & Stroock & Lavan in New York City.

Federal judicial service 

Cogan was nominated by President George W. Bush on January 25, 2006, to a seat vacated by Frederic Block. He was confirmed by the United States Senate on May 4, 2006, and received his commission on June 7, 2006. Cogan assumed senior status on June 12, 2020.

Notable cases 

Cogan was the judge for the trial of Joaquín "El Chapo" Guzmán, which lasted from November 13, 2018 to February 12, 2019 and ended with a guilty verdict.

References

Sources
 

1954 births
Living people
21st-century American judges
Cornell Law School alumni
Judges of the United States District Court for the Eastern District of New York
Lawyers from Chicago
New York (state) lawyers
United States district court judges appointed by George W. Bush
University of Illinois alumni